NorthEast United Football Club is an Indian professional football club based in Guwahati, Assam. The club was established on 13 April 2014 and competes in the Indian Super League, the top division league of Indian football. They play their home matches at the Indira Gandhi Athletic Stadium in Guwahati.

Managerial history

The current manager of the club is Marco Balbul.

2014 season
On 19 August 2014, former New Zealand international defender, Ricki Herbert was appointed as the  first head coach of Highlanders. The Highlanders finished 8th in the league table in their first season.

2015 season

After the 2014 season, it was announced that Ricki Herbert would not return to the club as head coach. On 1 July 2015, it was announced that former Venezuela head coach César Farías would take over as the Highlanders head coach. He guided the team to team to 5th in the table for the first time.

2016 season
After 2015 season, it was announced that César Farías wouldn't return as the head coach. On 13 May 2016, NorthEast United announced Sérgio Farias as the club's new head coach. However, Sérgio Farias joined his former club Suphanburi FC, during season forcing Highlanders to search for another manager. On 23 July 2016, NorthEast United announced Nelo Vingada as the club's new head coach.

2017–18 season
On 17 July 2017, the Highlanders appointed João de Deus as the new head coach for the season. On 2 January 2018, club sacked him due to the poor performance from the team. The team appointed technical advisor Avram Grant as their   new caretaker manager.

2018–19 season
For 2018–19 season , the highlanders named their assistant coach Eelco Schattorie as the new head coach. He led the team towards  2018–19 Indian Super League playoffs. They lost to Bengaluru FC in the second leg of semi-finals.

2019–20 season
On 5 August 2019, the highlanders announced former Croatian footballer Robert Jarni as their new head coach.
 After a winless streak of 11 games, Robert Jarni was sacked by the club on 11 February 2021 and Khalid Jamil was appointed as the interim head coach for the season.

2020–21 season
On 25 August 2020, the highlanders appointed Gerard Nus as their new head coach. On 13 January 2021, the club sacked Gerrad Nus for not maintaining club's philosophy and vision and installed Khalid Jamil as the interim coach. Under Khalid Jamil the team played their second-ever semifinals and lost to ATK Mohun Bagan FC in the second leg of playoffs.

2021–22 season 

On 23 October 2021, NorthEast United appointed Khalid Jamil as their new head coach for the upcoming season.He becomes the first permanent Indian manager in Indian Super League. Under his guidance, NorthEast began its 2021–22 Indian Super League campaign on 20 November with a 4–2 loss to Bengaluru FC. NorthEast United FC had a forgetful 2021-22 season after the highs of the 2020-21 season. They had a sluggish start to the season as injuries and issues off the pitch dictated their on field performances. The ISL’s first ever Indian head coach Khalid Jamil failed to live up to everyone’s expectations as the Highlanders finished 10th on the league standings.

2022–23 season 
On 11 August 2022, NorthEast United announced the signing of Marco Balbul as their manager for the upcoming season. On 8 December 2022, Vincenzo Alberto Annese joined Indian Super League club NorthEast United as the new head coach after the club sacked Marco Balbul mid-season.

Managers and statistics
Only competitive matches are taken into account.
Table headers
 Nationality – If the manager played international football as a player, the country/countries he played for are shown. Otherwise, the manager's nationality is given as their country of birth.
 From – The year of the manager's first game for NorthEast United.
 To – The year of the manager's last game for NorthEast United.
 P – The number of games managed for NorthEast United.
 W – The number of games won as a manager.
 D – The number of games draw as a manager.
 L – The number of games lost as a manager.
 GF – The number of goals scored under his management.
 GA – The number of goals conceded under his management.
 Win% – The total winning percentage under his management.

Managerial Records
Note: Interim managers and caretakers have been excluded from the list

As of 26 December 2022

Most Matches Managed:
 Eelco Schattorie –20
 Khalid Jamil –20
Least Matches Managed:
  Sérgio Farias –0
Most Wins:
  Eelco Schattorie –8
Most Defeats
  Khalid Jamil –12
Highest Win Percentage:
  César Farías –42.86
Least Win Percentage:
  Marco Balbul –0.00
Most Matches As Assistant Manager:
  Alison Kharsyntiew

Coaches individual awards while coaching NorthEast United
 NorthEast United coaches that have won the FPAI Coach of the Year award :
 Khalid Jamil: (1) 2020–21

Assistant Managers
The following is a list of all the persons who worked as an Assistant Manager for the club.
 Thangboi Singto (2014)
 Guillermo Sanchez (2015)
 Santosh Kashyap (2015)
 Arnaldo Carvalho (2016)
 Francisco Bruto Da Costa (2016)
 João Carlos Malhante de Pinho (2017–18)
 Eelco Schattorie (2017–18)
 Shaun Ontong (2018–19)
 Arthur Papas (2018–19)
 Khalid Jamil (2019–20)
 Sasa Glavas (2019–20)
 Ivan Piñol (2020–21)
 Alison Kharsyntiew (2020–2022)
 Paul Groves (2022–)
 Floyd Pinto (2022–)

Goalkeeping Coach 
The following is a list of all the persons who worked as a Goalkeeping Coach for the club.

 Gennaro Bracigliano (2015)
 Luís Matos (2016)
 Joseph Sidy (2017–19)
 Sandip Nandy (2019–20)
 Asier Rey Santín (2020–2022)
 Christian Patru (2021)
 Dipankar Choudhury (2022–)

See also
NorthEast United
NorthEast United FC Reserves and Academy
List of NorthEast United FC players

References

Managers
NorthEast United FC